The 1847 Michigan gubernatorial election was held on November 2, 1847. Democratic nominee Epaphroditus Ransom defeated Whig nominee James M. Edmunds with 53.32% of the vote.

General election

Candidates
Major party candidates
Epaphroditus Ransom, Democratic
James M. Edmunds, Whig
Other candidates
Chester Gurney, Liberty

Results

References

1847
Michigan
Gubernatorial
November 1847 events